Strong Hall is an administrative hall at the University of Kansas in Lawrence, Kansas, United States. The hall is on the National Register of Historic Places.

References

School buildings completed in 1911
University of Kansas campus
University and college buildings on the National Register of Historic Places in Kansas
Neoclassical architecture in Kansas
1911 establishments in Kansas
National Register of Historic Places in Douglas County, Kansas